Lollapuzzoola is a crossword-solving tournament held annually on a Saturday in August. Founded in 2008 by Brian Cimmet and Ryan Hecht, it is the second-largest crossword tournament in the United States, and the only major tournament in New York City. The term "Lollapuzzoola" was coined by Amanda Yesnowitz, as a play on the Lollapalooza music festival. Lollapuzzoola 15 took place online and in person on August 27, 2022, and was cohosted by Brian Cimmet, Brooke Husic, and Sid Sivakumar.

For its first three years, Lollapuzzoola was held at the First Methodist Church in Jackson Heights, New York, but owing to its increasing popularity, in 2011 the tournament moved to All Souls Church in New York, New York. In 2018, the tournament relocated again, still within New York City, to Riverside Church.

Lollapuzzoola traditionally opens with a non-crossword social mixer game to get everyone chatting and friendly with one another. The entire day is a combination of puzzles, camaraderie, and all-around goofiness.

Puzzles are constructed by major contributors to the New York Times, the Los Angeles Times, the Washington Post, and the Onion, among other publications. They have included Brendan Emmett Quigley, Peter Gordon, Patrick Berry, Ashish Vengsarkar, Dan Feyer, Doug Peterson, Mike Nothnagel, Tony Orbach, Barry C. Silk, Elizabeth C. Gorski, Karen M. Tracey, Byron Walden, Andrea Carla Michaels, Deb Amlen, Matt Gaffney, Joe Krozel, Neville Fogarty, Patrick Blindauer, Joon Pahk, Aimee Lucido, Zoe Wheeler, Kevin Der, and Tyler Hinman.

Lollapuzzoola and its founders are discussed in David Astle's book "Puzzled." Lollapuzzoola has also been frequently mentioned on the weekly crossword podcast Fill Me In, which is cohosted by Cimmet and Hecht.

Participants and divisions
Anyone can participate. There are two skill divisions, a rookie division, a pairs division, and for those who can't attend in person, an at-home division. Prizes are awarded in all divisions, with trophies and cash/gift certificate prizes for the top winners in the two skill divisions. For the purposes of prizes contestants compete simultaneously in all divisions for which they are eligible, with no more than one cash prize per contestant.

Format

The tournament consists of five rounds, each with a puzzle that all competitors solve. There are three rounds in the morning and two in the early afternoon. Puzzles vary in size and difficulty from round to round. The puzzles are commissioned by the tournament directors from the top constructors in crosswords, with the fourth puzzle the hardest of the set. The puzzles vary in size, shape, and difficulty, although the first one is traditionally a relatively easy 15x15 grid. The puzzles are always themed, and frequently themed in off-center, wacky ways not commonly seen in newspaper-published crosswords. For example, puzzles have included a "Name That Tune" gimmick; a post-solve Twister game; a puzzle that instructs the solver to eat a Chips Ahoy cookie upon completion; and a puzzle that required the entire room of solvers to make noises from their chairs, and thus perform an impromptu rendition of John Cage's 4'33''. Judges score the solved puzzles on accuracy and speed.

After these five rounds, the top three solvers in the two skill divisions progress to the final round, which consists of solving a very difficult crossword on an oversize grid onstage at the front of the room. The competitors in this round wear noise-blocking headphones. The solvers hold a sheet of clues and write their answers on the grid with a dry-erase marker for all to see. The competitors are ranked by fewest mistakes, then time. The winner of this round is declared the champion. The top three competitors in the Express and Local divisions compete on the same puzzle with different sets of clues for their titles.

Tournament history

Four times during Lollapuzzoola's history, New York Times crossword editor Will Shortz purchased puzzles commissioned for the tournament for publication in the newspaper. On September 5, 2009, Mike Nothnagel's final puzzle from Lollapuzzoola 2 was published in the New York Times (see XWordInfo.com page). On August 20, 2011, Byron Walden's final puzzle from Lollapuzzoola 4 was published (see XWordInfo.com page). On September 11, 2014, Patrick Blindauer's puzzle "Change of Heart" from Lollapuzzoola 7 was published (see XWordInfo.com page). On August 9, 2016, Andrea Carla Michaels's puzzle from Lollapuzzoola 4 was published in advance of the upcoming tournament, and (in part) as a promotion of Lollapuzzoola (see XWordInfo.com page). Each time, an additional block of text was added to the puzzle to tell solvers that this puzzle had appeared in a national tournament and to give information about the winner and their solving speed. In the case of Walden's puzzle, the byline was extended to include "edited by Brian Cimmet and Patrick Blindauer", the first and only instance of an editor besides Shortz since he began working for the Times.

Past Champions
As of 2018, there has been one multiple winner: Jeffrey Harris. Past champions traditionally return in subsequent years as judges and/or constructors.

External links
 Official website
 Official Twitter
 Facebook Business Page

References

Crossword competitions
Competitions in New York City
Recurring events established in 2008
August events